Wendell L. Avery (born October 20, 1956) is an American gridiron football coach and former player. He is the wide receivers coach for the Toronto Argonauts of the Canadian Football League (CFL). Avery served as the head football coach at Savannah State University (SSU) from 1995 to 1996, compiling a career college football record of 12–10.

College career
Avery spent three years playing quarterback for the University of Minnesota, suiting up for 33 games, throwing for 1,194 yards, 7 touchdowns and 10 interceptions. His best season was in 1978 when he recorded a season-high 663 yards with three touchdowns and six picks.

Head coaching record

References

1956 births
Living people
Alabama A&M Bulldogs football coaches
American football quarterbacks
Fort Valley State Wildcats football coaches
Macalester Scots football coaches
Minnesota Golden Gophers football players
Savannah State Tigers football coaches
Tampa Bay Buccaneers coaches
Winona State Warriors football coaches
Toronto Argonauts coaches
Sportspeople from Corpus Christi, Texas
African-American coaches of American football
African-American players of American football
African-American coaches of Canadian football
20th-century African-American sportspeople
21st-century African-American people